Philyllius, also called Phillylius, Phlaeus, Philolaus, or Phillydeus, was an ancient Athenian comic poet. He was contemporary with Diocles and Sannyrion. He belonged to the latter part of the Old Comedy tradition and the beginning of the Middle Comedy tradition. He seems to have attained to some distinction before 392 BC, when the Ecclesiazusae of Aristophanes was acted.

All titles of his plays evidently belong to Middle Comedy. He is said to have introduced some scenic innovations, such as bringing lighted torches on the stage. With regard to his language, Augustus Meineke mentions a few words and phrases in his plays, which are not pure Attic.

List of plays

The Suda and Eudocia gave titles of his plays:

Notes
α.  The last two titles are suspicious.

References

Bibliography
 Meineke, Frag. Com. Graec. vol. i. pp. 258–26], ii. pp. 857–866.
 Bergk, Comment, de Reliq. Com. Ait. Ant. p. 428.

Ancient Greek dramatists and playwrights
4th-century BC Athenians
Old Comic poets
Middle Comic poets